Gopal Bose (20 May 1947 – 26 August 2018) was an Indian cricketer. He played domestic cricket for Bengal and played one One Day International for India against England in 1974.

Bose was born in Kolkata, Indian state of West Bengal. He was a relatively successful first-class player with an ability to play long innings. He was selected in the national team for the tour of Ceylon (now Sri Lanka) where he impressed with a 194-run partnership with Sunil Gavaskar. He was again selected in the 14-member squad for the West Indies tour of 1974–75 but was surprisingly left out of the playing eleven and was never considered thereafter. He represented Bengal for the rest of his career with much success. In his career Bose had scored 3757 runs in 78 first-class games with eight hundreds and 17 fifties. He also took 72 wickets.

Bose was the head coach of Kolkata's Cricket Club of Dhakuria(CCD). He died in Birmingham on 26 August 2018, following a heart attack.

References

External links
 

1947 births
2018 deaths
Bengal cricketers
India One Day International cricketers
Indian cricketers
East Zone cricketers
State Bank of India cricketers
Cricketers from Kolkata
Indian cricket coaches